The 2008–09 Oregon Ducks men's basketball team represented the University of Oregon in the college basketball season of 2008–09. The team was coached by Ernie Kent and played their home games at McArthur Court.

The season came to an end on March 11, 2009 when the Ducks lost to Washington State in the first round of the Pac-10 tournament at the Staples Center in Los Angeles, 62–40. There were speculations that coach Ernie Kent would be fired after the season, however, he was retained as head coach.

Oregon's miserable 8-23 overall record and 2-17 record vs Pac 10 opponents remains widely regarded as the worst team in Oregon men's basketball history.

Roster

Recruiting
Class of 2009 Recruits

Schedule and results

|-
!colspan=9| Regular season

|-
!colspan=6 style="background:#004F27; color:yellow;"| Pac-10 tournament

References

Oregon Ducks
Oregon Ducks men's basketball seasons
Oregon
Oregon